St. Anthony-New Brighton School District, Minnesota Independent School District #282, is the school district serving all of St. Anthony Village and part of New Brighton, Minnesota.  The current district superintendent is Dr. Renee Sbrocco Corneille.

District Schools 
 St. Anthony Village High School
 St. Anthony Village Middle School
 Wilshire Park Elementary School

References

See also
List of school districts in Minnesota
District Home Page

School districts in Minnesota
Education in Ramsey County, Minnesota
Education in Hennepin County, Minnesota